The Buzzard Lope is a popular southern States dance dating from the 1890s, included in Minstrel Show repertoire, alongside the cakewalk and juba dance. Ostensibly, it is a representation of "a turkey buzzard getting ready to eat a dead Mule (some report a Cow)", performed with a comic sensibility known as hokum.

Reference is made to the dance in the penultimate line of the American blues/folk song "Johnny Brown":
Little Johnny Brown, spread your comfort down (2x)
Fold one corner, Johnny Brown
Fold another corner, Johnny Brown (3x)
Take it to your lover, Johnny Brown (2x)
Show her your motion, Johnny Brown (2x)
Lope like a buzzard, Johnny Brown (2x)
Give it to your lover, Johnny Brown (2x)

References 

Dances of the United States